The following is a list of feature films produced and distributed by the American studio Columbia Pictures between 1960 and 1969. During the decade Columbia was transformed from a traditional studio into a corporation. An increasing number of international films were released, including a number produced by its British subsidiary.

1960

1961

1962

1963

1964

1965

1966

1967

1968

1969

See also
 List of Columbia Pictures films

References

Bibliography
 Dick, Bernard F. Columbia Pictures: Portrait of a Studio. University Press of Kentucky, 2014.

1960
American films by studio
Sony Pictures Entertainment Motion Picture Group